Anne Nørdsti (born in Alvdal on June 19, 1977) residing in Ottestad is a Norwegian singer in the dansband genre, influenced by country music.

She started as a vocalist in Kolbus, a dansband. Then launching a solo career, she has released seven albums, with debut being Bygdeliv in 2004 in the danseband genre. First five albums were on Tylden & Co., but she changed labels and her sixth album Så gøtt... appeared on Mariann Records Norge.

In 2007, she won Spellemannprisen award in the Dance orchestra category" for her 2007 album for the album Livli' 

Her Anne Nørdstis Band is composed of Bjørn Løvås on guitar, Stein Tore Sønsteli on keyboard, Per Erik Pedersen on bass and Finn Andresen on drums.

Discography
2004: Bygdeliv
2005: Bonderomantikk
2006: Her vil jeg bo
2007: Livli'''
2009: Livet er nå2011: Så gøtt...2012: På kryss og tvers2014: Danser I Måneskinn''

References

Norwegian country singers
Spellemannprisen winners
People from Alvdal
1977 births
Living people
21st-century Norwegian singers